The Seaforth Country Classic is a golf tournament on the Canadian Tour. Since the tournament's founding in 2008, it has been played at the Seaforth Golf Club in Seaforth, Ontario.

Winners
Seaforth Country Classic
2011  Brian Unk

The Economical Insurance Group Seaforth Country Classic
2010  Kent Eger

Seaforth Country Classic
2009  Brian Unk
2008  Kent Eger

External links

Coverage on Canadian Tour's official site

Golf tournaments in Ontario
Former PGA Tour Canada events